Sette Bello (1962–1979) was an American Thoroughbred racehorse best known for winning the 1968 Widener Handicap at Hialeah Park Race Track in Florida and as the damsire of  Timely Writer. Sired by the Italian runner, Ribot, Sette Belo's dam was Honor Bound, a daughter of Bull Dog.

Sette Bello was bred and raced by New York City investment banker Robert Lehman and race conditioned by U.S. Racing Hall of Fame trainer, Jimmy Conway. Sette Bello was named by Mrs. Lehman for an Italian express train run from Milan to Rome, the Settebello, that can be translated as the "lucky or beautiful seven."

References

1962 racehorse births
1979 racehorse deaths
Thoroughbred family 1-o
Racehorses bred in Kentucky
Racehorses trained in the United States